The 3rd Annual Interactive Achievement Awards is the 3rd edition of the Interactive Achievement Awards, an annual awards event that honors the best games in the video game industry. The awards are arranged by the Academy of Interactive Arts & Sciences (AIAS), and were held at the Millennium Biltmore Hotel in Los Angeles, California on May 11, 2000 during E3 2000. It was hosted by Martin Short, and featured presenters included Martin Lewis, Ahmet Zappa, Stevie Case, Brian Fargo, Alison Sweeney, Harry Shearer, Elisa Donovan, Leah Lail, Carmine Giovinazzo, Delroy Lindo, and Peter Molyneux. This would be the final year the awards ceremony would be held during E3.

Age of Empires II: Age of Kings received the most nominations. It also tied for winning the most awards along with Final Fantasy VIII and The Sims, which won Game of the Year. Electronic Arts received the most nominations and won the most awards. There was also a tie for the Outstanding Achievement in Character or Story Development.

Hironobu Sakaguchi was also the received the of the Academy of Interactive Arts & Sciences Hall of Fame Award.

Winners and Nominees
Winners are listed first, highlighted in boldface, and indicated with a double dagger.

Hall of Fame Award
 Hironobu Sakaguchi

Games with multiple nominations and awards

The following 25 games received multiple nominations:

The following four games received multiple awards:

Companies with multiple nominations

Companies that received multiple nominations as either a developer or a publisher.

Companies that received multiple awards as either a developer or a publisher.

External links
 Archived Finalists List Portal

Notes

References

Annual Interactive Achievement Awards
Annual Interactive Achievement Awards
Annual Interactive Achievement Awards
Annual Interactive Achievement Awards
1999 in video gaming
2000 in video gaming
D.I.C.E. Award ceremonies